Throsby may refer to:

In Australian geography:
Division of Throsby, an Australian electoral division.
Throsby, Australian Capital Territory, suburb of Canberra, named after Charles Throsby

People:
Throsby (surname)